Leiodes is a genus of round fungus beetles in the family Leiodidae. There are at least 110 described species in Leiodes.

ITIS Taxonomic note: 
 Published before 13 Jan 1797 per Bouchard et al. (2011).

See also
 List of Leiodes species

References

Further reading

Articles created by Qbugbot
Leiodidae